The Eastern Zone was one of the three regional zones of the 1969 Davis Cup.

8 teams entered the Eastern Zone, competing across 2 sub-zones. The winner of each sub-zones would play against each other to determine who would compete in the Inter-Zonal Zone against the winners of the Americas Zone and Europe Zone.

Japan received a walkover in the Zone A final after South Vietnam withdrew, while India defeated Ceylon in the Zone B final. In the Inter-Zonal final India defeated Japan and progressed to the Inter-Zonal Zone.

Zone A

Draw

Quarterfinals

Indonesia vs. Philippines

Semifinals

Japan vs. Philippines

South Korea vs. South Vietnam

Final
Japan defeated South Vietnam by walkover.

Zone B

Draw

Semifinals

Malaysia vs. India

Final

Ceylon vs. India

Eastern Inter-Zonal Final

India vs. Japan

References

External links
Davis Cup official website

Davis Cup Asia/Oceania Zone
Eastern Zone
Davis Cup